Zec de la Rivière-Saint-Jean-du-Saguenay is a zone d'exploitation contrôlée (controlled harvesting zone) (zec) located in the municipalité of L'Anse-Saint-Jean, in Le Fjord-du-Saguenay Regional County Municipality (RCM), in administrative region of Saguenay–Lac-Saint-Jean, in Quebec, in Canada.

The "Zec de la Rivière-Saint-Jean-du-Saguenay" administer some segments of Saint-Jean River. While the zec de l'Anse-Saint-Jean administers the public lands on a forested territory around the river.

Toponymy
The toponym "Zec de la Rivière-Saint-Jean-du-Saguenay" was officialized on October 7, 1994 at the Bank of place names of Commission de toponymie du Québec (Geographical Names Board of Quebec).

See also

Notes et references

Related articles 
 Zec de l'Anse-Saint-Jean
 L'Anse-Saint-Jean, municipality
 Saint-Jean River
 Saint-Jean Bay, a bay
 Saguenay River
 Le Fjord-du-Saguenay Regional County Municipality
 Saguenay-Lac-Saint-Jean, administrative region of Quebec
 Parc national du Fjord-du-Saguenay
 Zone d'exploitation contrôlée (controlled harvesting zone) (ZEC)

Attachment

External links 
  of "Zec de la Rivière-Saint-Jean-du-Saguenay".
Official website of municipality L'Anse Saint-Jean

Protected areas established in 1994
Protected areas of Saguenay–Lac-Saint-Jean